Felice Taylor (born Florain Corella Flanagan, January 29, 1944 – June 12, 2017) was an American soul and pop singer, best known for her recordings in the late 1960s.

The Sweets

Born in Richmond, California, United States, Taylor began singing with her sisters Norma and Darlene Flanagan in a trio, The Sweets, who recorded two singles, "The Richest Girl", for the Valiant label in 1965 and "Satisfy Me Baby" on the Soul Town label.

Solo career
Taylor's first solo recording, "Think About Me" on the Groovy label, was credited to Florain Taylor.  Her greatest success came after signing for Bob Keane's Mustang label, a subsidiary of Bronco Records. There she was teamed with the songwriters and record producers, Barry White and Paul Politi, who co-wrote "It May Be Winter Outside (But in My Heart It's Spring)", a minor hit reaching No. 42 on the Billboard Hot 100 and No. 44 on the R&B chart in early 1967, and its follow-up "I'm Under the Influence of Love".  A third single, "I Feel Love Comin' On", also written and produced by White and Politi was not released in the US, but reached No. 11 in the UK Singles Chart, when leased to President Records later in 1967.

After leaving Bronco, Taylor recorded for Kent Records, and later in the UK with members of The Equals. In 1973, White's protegées Love Unlimited recorded new versions of "It May Be Winter Outside" and "Under the Influence of Love" and Barry White recorded "I Feel Love Comin' On" on the Love Unlimited Orchestra's top ten album Rhapsody in White. Taylor herself seems not to have recorded after the early 1970s.

Personal life
She was married to Johnny B Taylor and had four children.

She died in June 2017, aged 73. She was interred at the Riverside National Cemetery in Riverside, California.

Discography

Singles

References

External links
Felice Taylor discography

1944 births
2017 deaths
American rhythm and blues singers
20th-century African-American women singers
Musicians from Richmond, California
Northern soul musicians
Singers from California
21st-century African-American people
21st-century African-American women